Siege (sometimes stylised as SIEGE) is an anthology of essays first published as a single volume in 1992, written in 1980s by James Mason, a neo-Nazi and associate of the serial killer Charles Manson. After growing disillusioned with the mass movement approach of neo-Nazi movements, he began advocating for white revolution through terrorism. Referred to as the "Godfather of Fascist Terrorism", Mason has been proscribed as a "terrorist entity" in Canada.” Mason originally wrote the essays for the eponymous newsletter of the National Socialist Liberation Front, a militant splinter of the American Nazi Party.

Content and ideology: "Siege Culture"
The ideology of Siege is commonly called "Siege Culture" by neo-Nazis and counter-extremism experts alike. Siege Culture takes inspiration from Nazism and includes the idea of a The System, which is a conspiracy of the government, Jews and capitalists acting against white interests. Within Siege Culture, Fascism is the highest truth and the natural state in which whites dominate all others. As a result, Siege Culture believes that any softening of the message to increase their appeal is impossible, and that any form compromise is inherently flawed. Siege Culture is critical of other right-wingers who are seen as being uncommitted and resulting in a belief that they represent a revolutionary vanguard with access to special truths. In a memo, the FBI mentions a "Siege network," which they describe as a "global network of online channels and real-world groups that cooperate with each other in analog reality." Likewise Europol noted on "Terrorist Situation and Trend Report" for 2022 that "SIEGE and Accelerationism, both with significant potential for inciting violence, were the most prominent ideologies in 2021, especially attracting young people radicalised online."

Members of Iron March, a neo-fascist internet forum linked to almost 100 murders republished and popularized Mason's book "Siege" and its brand of explicitly terroristic neo-nazism. According to International Centre for Counter-Terrorism: 
While [ Atomwaffen Division and Russian Imperial Movement ] are serial purveyors of online extremism and often celebrate terrorism in their fora, deeper similarities extend to a shared ideological embrace of “accelerationism” and, in particular, a recently-revived doctrine advanced by the neo-Nazi ideologue, James Mason, now termed “Siege Culture.”...terroristic advocacy of “Siege Culture” has a radicalising effect on right-wing extremists".

Although fringe ideology even among right-wing extremists, "Siege Culture has underpinned many of the recent counter terrorism cases linked to the extreme-right in the UK" according to Centre for Research and Evidence on Security Threats. Siege is an obligatory read for those within the contemporary neo-Nazi movement today, and Mason is considered by some to be the most important fascist revolutionary alive. Siege explicitly advocated “lone-wolf terrorism,” years before the better-known Louis Beam published his essay “Leaderless Resistance. Having finally found his audience, Mason’s writings have inspired a global spike in militant neo-Nazi activity. Especially for younger neo-Nazis, since 2015 Siege has been a foundational text, arguably rivalling Mein Kampf. Counter-terrorists experts have found this concerning because Siege is at the "shamelessly terroristic" end of right-wing extremism". Globally Siege Culture has been connected to innumerable terror attacks and plots, Counter Extremism Project connected Siege Culture to 25 terrorists in 2020 alone. For example, in Finland in 2021 five men who according to the Finnish security services adhered to Siege Culture were arrested with assault rifles and tens of kilos of explosives. According to the SPLC, the new generation neo-Nazis are going through "total immersion in Mason’s teleology [...] they are challenging the established far-right and far-left with their eagerness to perpetrate violence."

The meme "Read Siege" and hashtag #ReadSiege became popular among the internet neo-Nazis and alt-right social media.

Siege Culture organizations
Atomwaffen Division is an accelerationist neo-Nazi terror organization found in 2013 by Brandon Russell responsible for multiple murders and mass casualty plots. Atomwaffen has been proscribed as a terror organization in United Kingdom, Canada and Australia.
The Base is a neo-Nazi, white supremacist and accelerationist paramilitary hate group and training network, formed in 2018 by Rinaldo Nazzaro and active in the United States, Canada, Australia, South Africa, and Europe.  it is considered a terrorist organization in Canada, Australia and the United Kingdom.
Combat 18 is a neo-Nazi organization that has been proscribed in Canada and Germany and is tied to the assassination of Walter Lübcke and the 2009 Vítkov arson attack.
Nordic Resistance Movement is a pan-Nordic neo-Nazi organization that adheres to accelerationism and is tied to ONA and multiple terror plots and murders, like the murder of an antifascist in Helsinki in 2016. There has been an international effort to proscribe NRM as a terrorist organization, and it was banned as such in Finland in 2019.
Order of Nine Angles is a neo-Nazi satanist organization that has been connected to multiple murders and terror plots. There has been an international effort to proscribe ONA as a terror organization. Further, the ONA is connected to the Atomwaffen and the Base and the founder of ONA David Myatt was one-time leader of the C18.
Russian Imperial Movement is a white supremacist organization found in Russia and proscribed as a terror organization in United States and Canada for its connection to neo-fascist terrorists. People trained by RIM have gone on to commit a series of bombings and joined the separatist militants in Donbass.

References

External links

Antisemitic publications
Conspiracist media
Neo-Nazism in the United States
Neo-Nazi propaganda
1992 non-fiction books
Books about conspiracy theories
Holocaust-denying books
Books about Nazism